As of February 2023, Yemenia offers scheduled passenger services to the following:

Current destinations

Africa

Eastern Africa
 
 Djibouti City - Djibouti–Ambouli International Airport
 
 Addis Ababa - Addis Ababa Bole International Airport

Northern Africa
 
 Cairo - Cairo International Airport
 
 Khartoum - Khartoum International Airport

Asia

Middle East
 
 Amman - Queen Alia International Airport
 
 Jeddah - King Abdulaziz International Airport
 Riyadh - King Khalid International Airport
 
 Aden - Aden International Airport Hub
 Mukalla - Riyan Airport Focus
 Sana'a - Sana'a International Airport
 Seiyun - Seiyun Airport Focus
 Socotra - Socotra Airport

Suspended destinations

Africa

Eastern Africa
 
 Moroni - Prince Said Ibrahim International Airport
 
 Asmara - Asmara International Airport
 
 Nairobi - Jomo Kenyatta International Airport

Southern Africa
 
 Johannesburg - O. R. Tambo International Airport

Asia

East Asia
 
 Guangzhou - Guangzhou Baiyun International Airport

Middle East
 
 Manama - Bahrain International Airport
 
 Baghdad - Baghdad International Airport
 
 Kuwait City - Kuwait International Airport
 
 Beirut - Beirut–Rafic Hariri International Airport
 
 Muscat - Muscat International Airport
 
 Doha - Hamad International Airport
 
 Abu Dhabi - Abu Dhabi International Airport
 Dubai - Al Maktoum International Airport
 Dubai - Dubai International Airport
 Sharjah - Sharjah International Airport
 
 Al Ghaydah - Al Ghaydah Airport
 Al Hudaydah - Hodeida International Airport
 Ta'izz - Ta'izz International Airport

South Asia
 
 Mumbai - Chhatrapati Shivaji Maharaj International Airport

Southeast Asia
 
 Jakarta - Soekarno–Hatta International Airport
 
 Kuala Lumpur - Kuala Lumpur International Airport

Europe

Western Europe
 
 Marseille - Marseille Provence Airport
 Paris - Charles de Gaulle Airport
 
 Frankfurt - Frankfurt Airport
 
 Amsterdam - Amsterdam Airport Schiphol
 
 London - Heathrow Airport

Southern Europe
 
 Milan - Milan–Malpensa Airport
 Rome - Leonardo da Vinci–Fiumicino Airport
 
 Madrid - Adolfo Suárez Madrid–Barajas Airport

Eastern Europe
 
 Moscow - Sheremetyevo International Airport
 
 Belgrade – Belgrade Nikola Tesla Airport

References 

Lists of airline destinations